The Supreme People's Council may refer to:

Supreme People's Council (Prussian Poland)
Supreme People's Council (South Yemen)
Supreme People's Council (Laos)
Supreme People's Council (North Korea)